"Quicksand" is a song by British singer Tom Chaplin. It was released on 26 August 2016 as the first single from his first studio album, The Wave (2016), where it appears as the eighth track. Chaplin wrote the song for his daughter Freya.

Music video
A music video for the song became available to view on YouTube on August 25, 2016 as its worldwide release.

Track listing

Charts

Release history

References

2016 debut singles
2016 songs
Tom Chaplin songs
Songs written by Tom Chaplin
Songs written by Aqualung (musician)